The Wongungarra River is a perennial river of the Mitchell River catchment, located in the Alpine region of the Australian state of Victoria.

Location and features
The river flows generally south by east, joined by six tributaries including the Crooked River before reaching its confluence with the Wonnangatta River near the small settlement of Crooked River south of the Alpine National Park in the Alpine Shire. The river descends  over its  course.

Etymology

In the Australian Aboriginal Brabralung/Daungwurrung dialect of the Gunai language, the name for the Wongungarra River is Gwannam-o-rook, meaning "eaglehawk".

See also

 List of rivers in Australia

References

External links
 
 

East Gippsland catchment
Rivers of Gippsland (region)
Rivers of Hume (region)
Victorian Alps